Elisabeth Lukas (born 12 November 1942) is an Austrian psychiatrist and is one of the central figures in logotherapy, a branch of psychotherapy founded by Viktor Frankl. Lukas is an author of 30 books, translated into 16 languages.

Lukas developed a Logo-Test to measure Viktor Frankl's principles of logotherapy, primarily the perceived degree of meaning in life on the part of the individual. The test also attempts to measure possible noogenic neurosis.

Books 
 Meaning in Suffering: Comfort in Crisis Through Logotherapy (1986)
 The Therapist and the Soul: From Fate to Freedom (1985)
 Quand la vie retrouve un sens, Introduction à la logothérapie (2014, Ed. Téqui - Traduction de Lebensbesinnung (1995))
 Logotherapy: Principles and Methods (2020)
 Understanding Man's Search for Meaning: Reflections on Viktor Frankl's Logotherapy (2019)
 Meaningful Living: Introduction to Logotherapy Theory and Practice (2019) with Bianca Hirsch
 A Unique Approach to Family Counseling: Logotherapy, Crisis, and Youth (2019)

See also 
 Joseph Fabry

References 

20th-century Austrian women writers
21st-century Austrian women writers
1942 births
Austrian women psychiatrists
Living people